Fayette County is a county located in the U.S. state of Tennessee.  As of the 2020 census, the population was 41,990. Its county seat is Somerville. The county was named after the Marquis de la Fayette, French hero of the American Revolution. A part of the Memphis, TN-MS-AR Metropolitan Statistical Area, Fayette County is culturally alike to the Mississippi Delta and was a major area of cotton plantations dependent on slave labor in the nineteenth century.

History
Fayette County was established by Tennessee General Assembly in 1824 from the neighboring counties of Shelby and Hardeman. The same year, Somerville was selected as its county seat. The first churches in the county were the First Presbyterian Church in Somerville, established in 1829, and Immanuel Parish, established in 1832.

Herb Parsons 1908–1959) of Somerville, Tennessee, was Winchester's "Showman Shooter" for 30 years.

Following the emancipation of slaves on plantations, many of Fayette County's African-American residents worked as sharecroppers. In the 1960s and 1970s, civil rights activists fought for school integration and voting rights; and created tent cities to house displaced tenant farmers who had tried to register to vote.

In recent years, Fayette County has been transitioning from a rural area to accommodate the suburban sprawl from Memphis.

Geography
It is the third-largest county in Tennessee by area. The county is, roughly, the same size as Marshall County, Mississippi.

Adjacent counties
Haywood County (north)
Hardeman County (east)
Benton County, Mississippi (southeast)
Marshall County, Mississippi (south)
Shelby County (west)
Tipton County (northwest)

State protected areas
William B. Clark Conservation Area
Ghost River State Natural Area
Piperton Wetland Complex Wildlife Management Area (part)
Wolf River Wildlife Management Area
WMA Briggs Tract
Herb Parsons Lake

Demographics

Since the four-lane expansion of Highway 64 in the early 1990s, western Fayette County has had a population explosion. Although the county seat is still in Somerville, the population of Oakland has far surpassed it because of the influx of people working in Shelby County and seeking more affordable housing.

Although Fayette County is growing on its western side, the county's economy is still based on agriculture. Historically it was a site of cotton plantations as part of the Mississippi Delta. Several of the county's largest farmers control the vast majority of the county's wealth.  Some of these families have been farming for generations dating back to plantations before the Civil War. Others are younger farmers who have used their skill, business savvy, and work ethic to develop large farming operations.

Fayette County has become a destination for people of the Memphis metro area. This group is known by Fayette County natives as "Shelby County Spillover" or "White Flight Memphonites". The total value for building permits in June 2007 was close to that of the much larger Memphis suburban area of DeSoto County, Mississippi.

2020 census

As of the 2020 United States census, there were 41,990 people, 15,596 households, and 11,567 families residing in the county.

2010 census
As of the census of 2010 there were 38,413 people, 14,505 households, and 11,029 families residing in the county. The population density was 54.49 persons per square mile and the housing unit density was 20.57 units per square mile. The racial makeup of the county was 69.19% White, 28.07% Black or African American, 0.48% Asian, 0.28% Native American, 0.01% Pacific Islander, 1.08% from other races, and 0.89% from two or more races. Those of Hispanic or Latino origins were 2.23% of the population.

Of the 14,505 households, 32.58% had children under the age of 18 living in them, 58.24% were married couples living together, 4.64% had a male householder with no wife present, 13.15% had a female householder with no husband present, and 23.96% were non-families. 20.77% of all households were made up of individuals, and 7.71% had someone living alone who was 65 years of age or older. The average household size was 2.62 and the average family size was 3.02

Of the 38,413 residents, 23.11% were under the age of 18, 62.01% were between the ages of 18 and 64, and 14.88% were 65 years of age or older. The median age was 41.9 years. 50.42% of the residents were female, and 49.58% were male.

The median household income in the county was $57,919 and the median family income was $68,159. Males had a median income of $50,560 versus $40,412 for females. The per capita income for the county was $30,471. About 9.9% of families and 14.4% of the population were below the poverty line, including 22.1% of those under the age of 18 and 9.8% of those age 65 and over.

2000 census
As of the census of 2000, there were 28,806 people, 10,467 households, and 8,017 families residing in the county. There were 11,214 housing units at an average density of 16 per square mile (6/km2). The racial makeup of the county was 62.48% White, 35.95% Black or African American, 0.19% Native American, 0.22% Asian, 0.01% Pacific Islander, 0.39% from other races, and 0.76% from two or more races. 1.03% of the population were Hispanic or Latino of any race.

According to the census of 2000, the largest ancestry groups in Fayette County were English 51.66%, African 35.95%, Scots-Irish 7.1%, and Scottish 1.2%.

In 2000 there were 10,467 households, out of which 31.00% had children under the age of 18 living with them, 58.50% were married couples living together, 14.00% had a female householder with no husband present, and 23.40% were non-families. 20.50% of all households were made up of individuals, and 8.60% had someone living alone who was 65 years of age or older. The average household size was 2.71 and the average family size was 3.14.

In the county, the population was spread out, with 25.70% under the age of 18, 8.20% from 18 to 24, 27.40% from 25 to 44, 25.60% from 45 to 64, and 13.00% who were 65 years of age or older. The median age was 38 years. For every 100 females there were 96.50 males. For every 100 females age 18 and over, there were 92.20 males.

The median income for a household in the county was $40,279, and the median income for a family was $46,283. Males had a median income of $33,603 versus $24,690 for females. The per capita income for the county was $17,969. About 10.90% of families and 14.30% of the population were below the poverty line, including 18.40% of those under age 18 and 18.00% of those age 65 or over.

Education
 
Fayette Ware Comprehensive High
Fayette Academy (PK-12 Independent School)
Fayette Christian School
Rossville Christian Academy
West Jr High
East Jr High
Buckley-Carpenter Elementary School
Southwest Elementary
Oakland Elementary
LaGrange-Moscow Elementary
University of Tennessee at Martin (Somerville Campus)

Communities

Cities

 Gallaway
 Grand Junction‡ (partial)
 Moscow
 Piperton
 Williston

Towns

 Braden
 La Grange
 Oakland
 Rossville
 Somerville (county seat)

Unincorporated communities

 Fisherville‡
 Hickory Withe
 Laconia
 Liberty Hill
 Macon
 Yum Yum
 Zu Zu

Politics

Fayette County has a 19-seat legislative body referred to as the Board of County Commissioners representing 8 districts.  All positions are elected every four years.

 District 1 (Somerville)
 Willie German
 Charles Dacus
 District 2 (Laconia)
 Ray Seals
 Tommy Perkins
 District 3 (Gallaway/Braden/Garnett)
 Elizabeth Rice
 Bill Walker
 Jim Norton
 District 4 (Oakland)
 David Webb
 Kevin Powers
 Tim A. Goodroe
 District 5 (Piperton/Rossville)
 Sylvester Logan
 Claude Oglesby, Jr.
 Ben Farley
 District 6 (Moscow/Williston)
 David Lillard, Sr.
 Steve Reeves
 District 7 (Moscow/LaGrange)
 Larry Watkins
 Jimmy Jordan
 District 8 (Hickory Withe/Eads)
 Robert Sills
 Terry Leggett

The County Mayor is currently Rhea "Skip" Taylor.

Historically, Fayette County was part of the "Solid South" whereby the county's black majority was entirely disenfranchised. From the end of Reconstruction until Harry S. Truman's civil rights proposals during the 1940s, Democrats won over 85 percent of Fayette County's vote even in 1920 and 1928 when Warren G. Harding and Herbert Hoover carried the state's electoral votes. During the Civil Rights era, Fayette County's politics resembled that of Mississippi more than that of the rest of Tennessee, with Strom Thurmond winning over 83 percent of the county's limited electorate in 1948 and T. Coleman Andrews carrying the county as a "States' Rights" candidate in 1956. Once the county's blacks were enfranchised during the 1960s, Democrats would carry the county or only lose narrowly between 1976 and 1996, but in the twenty-first century as the county becomes increasingly white and suburban, its strongly conservative social views have made it strongly Republican.  The first county Republican Primary was held in 2018.

See also
National Register of Historic Places listings in Fayette County, Tennessee
 Herb Parsons Lake
 Wolf River (Tennessee)
 Wolf River Conservancy

References

External links

 Official site
 Fayette County Chamber of Commerce
 Fayette County Schools
Fayette Academy - PreK - 12 Private School
 Fayette County, TNGenWeb – genealogy resources 
 "October 1960: The Untold Story of the Civil Rights Struggle in Fayette County, Tennessee", multi-part series in The Jackson Sun by Jimmy Hart
 

 
Counties in the Memphis metropolitan area
1824 establishments in Tennessee
Populated places established in 1824
Second Amendment sanctuaries in Tennessee
West Tennessee